Paul LaRosa [aka Paul La Rosa] is a CBS News writer & producer, journalist, author and book reviewer. He is a four-time Emmy Award winner and has won every major award in television journalism and numerous awards when he was a print reporter.

Biography

Early life
LaRosa [La Rosa] was born in East Harlem and raised in the James Monroe Houses, a public housing project located in the Soundview section of The Bronx. His first job was delivering the New York Daily News. He currently resides in Park Slope, Brooklyn.
Prior to Fordham he studied at Cardinal Hayes High School in the Bronx.

Career
Following his graduation from Fordham University, LaRosa was employed at the Daily News from 1975 until 1990, starting out as a copy boy. After being promoted to reporter, he worked on various beats, including crime, labor and city government. Among the major stories he covered was the fatal shooting of John Lennon at The Dakota. In 1984, he was awarded a R evson Fellowship for the Future of the City of New York and attended Columbia University for one year.

In 1992, he began working at CBS News, soon producing stories for 48 Hours. Concurrently, he wrote four true crime books, beginning with 2006's Tacoma Confidential: A True Story of Murder, Suicide, and a Police Chief’s Secret Life. His 2012 memoir, Leaving Story Avenue: My Journey From the Projects to the Front Page, covers his life from his rough upbringing to his career as a reporter and producer. The New York Times called it "a captivating and vivid memoir." He has also written one novel "Get Back, Imagine Saving John Lennon," under the pseudonym Donovan Day.

In recent years, La Rosa has begun to write book reviews for the New York Journal of Books.

Awards
In 1983, as a Daily News reporter, LaRosa was named co-winner of the Meyer Berger Award, along with Anna Quindlen of the New York Times. The prize is awarded annually by the Columbia University Graduate School of Journalism for outstanding local writing about New York City.

He won a 2002 Emmy Award as a producer for the CBS documentary 9/11. He also won a 2002 Peabody Award, a 2003 Christopher Award and a 2003 Edward R. Murrow Award for producing 9/11. He was nominated for another Emmy in 2010 for producing 48 Hours Mystery – Craigslist: Classified for Murder. LaRosa has also won three Gracie Awards presented by t he Alliance of Women in Media.

In 2018, LaRosa won a New York Press Club Award in the Special Event category for a piece he wrote and produced titled "A Nation Divided." It featured interviews with middle school students who were largely from immigrant families and worried about the inauguration of President Donald J. Trump.

Books

Memoir
 Leaving Story Avenue: My Journey From the Projects to the Front Page (2012, Park Slope Publishing)

True crime
 Seven Days of Rage: The Deadly Crime Spree of the Craigslist Killer – with Maria Cramer (2010, Pocket Star)
 Death of a Dream – with Erin Moriarty (2008, Pocket Star)
 Nightmare in Napa: The Wine Country Murders (2007, Pocket Star)
 Tacoma Confidential: A True Story of Murder, Suicide, and a Police Chief’s Secret Life (2006, Signet)

Novels

– Get Back, Imagine Saving John Lennon by Donovan Day (pseudonym)

Television
 48 Hours Mystery – Producer – various episodes (1993 – current, CBS)
 Survivor – Producer – "Surviving Survivor" special – (2010, CBS)
 "All Access Grammy Special" – Producer (2009, CBS)
 "39 Days"—Producer (2018, CBS News)

References

External links
 Official website
 Leaving Story Avenue official website

Living people
American male writers
American television producers
1953 births
People from East Harlem
Fordham University alumni